Tonic Lounge was a bar and music venue located at 3100 Northeast Sandy Blvd., in Portland, Oregon's Kerns neighborhood.

History

The venue was briefly known as Panic Room Caution: High Volume Bar and The Raven, before returning to the name Tonic Lounge in March 2017.

In May 2017, the venue cancelled a scheduled performance by the Swedish band Shining because of reports about Niklas Kvarforth's behavior.

Tonic Lounge closed on August 31, 2019.

See also
 Bar Rescue (season 4)
 List of Bar Rescue episodes

References

External links

 
 

2019 disestablishments in Oregon
Event venues disestablished in 2019
Kerns, Portland, Oregon
Defunct music venues in Portland, Oregon
Northeast Portland, Oregon